The Aït Oussa, is a large Sahrawi tribe in Morocco. 
They are a branch of the Tekna tribes 

The tribe numbers about 50,000 persons. The Aït Oussa tribes speak  and Hassaniya Arabic, and are Muslims, mainly belonging to the Maliki school of Sunni Islam.

References

Sahrawi tribes